Philiris apicalis is a species of butterfly of the family Lycaenidae. It is found in New Guinea (New Britain and New Ireland).

Subspecies
Philiris apicalis apicalis (New Britain)
Philiris apicalis ginni Müller, 2002 (New Ireland)

References

Butterflies described in 1963
Luciini